Ako ang Batas: General Karingal is a 1990 Philippine biographical action film directed by Francis "Jun" Posadas. The film stars Eddie Garcia as the title role. The film is based on the life of Gen. Tomas Karingal.

Cast
 Eddie Garcia as Gen. Tomas Karingal
 John Regala as Young Lt. Tomas Karingal
 Cesar Montano as Lt. Reyes
 Marita Zobel as Mrs. Karingal
 Michael Locsin
 Jobelle Salvador
 Maita Soriano as Soledad
 Jovit Moya 
 Orestes Ojeda 
 Tony Angeles
 Ria Arcache as Mam
 Robert Arevalo
 Janet Arnaiz as Baby
 Jun King Austria
 Turko Cervantes
 Ernie David
 Renato del Prado
 Ernie Forte
 Big Boy Gomez
 Usman Hassim
 Subas Herrero as Judge San Agustin
 Precious Hipolito
 Edward Luna

References

External links

1990 films
Filipino-language films
Philippine action films
Philippine biographical films
Seiko Films films
1990 action films
Films directed by Francis Posadas